Tyringham is a village in Buckinghamshire, England.

Tyringham may also refer to:

Tyringham, Massachusetts, United States
Tyringham, New South Wales, Australia, see Clarence Valley Council#Towns and localities
William Tyringham, an English politician

See also